Łukawica  ( or , Lukavets’ or Lukavytsia) is a village in the administrative district of Gmina Lesko, within Lesko County, Subcarpathian Voivodeship, in south-eastern Poland.

References

Villages in Lesko County